Quốc Oai may refer to several places in Vietnam, including:

 Quốc Oai District, a rural district of Hanoi.
 Quốc Oai, Hanoi, a township and capital of Quốc Oai District.
 Quốc Oai, Lâm Đồng, a rural commune of Lâm Hà District.